Halldórsdóttir is an Icelandic patronymic surname, literally meaning "daughter of Halldór". Notable people with the name include:

Elínborg Halldórsdóttir (born 1962), Icelandic musician and painter
Guðný Halldórsdóttir (born 1954), Icelandic film director and screenwriter
Hafrún Rakel Halldórsdóttir (born 2002), Icelandic footballer
Kristín Halldórsdóttir (1939–2016), Icelandic politician and journalist
Kolbrún Halldórsdóttir (born 1955), Icelandic politician

Icelandic-language surnames